Evje is a district in the municipality of Bærum, Norway. Its population (2007) is 4,010.

References

Villages in Akershus
Neighbourhoods in Bærum